Krachia obeliscoides is a species of sea snail, a gastropod in the family Cerithiopsidae, which is known from European water. It was described by Jeffreys, in 1885.

Distribution
This marine species was found at bathyal depths off Portugal.

References

 Bouchet P. & Warén A. (1993). Revision of the Northeast Atlantic bathyal and abyssal Mesogastropoda. Bollettino Malacologico supplemento 3: 579-840

Cerithiopsidae
Gastropods described in 1885